The Church of St. Michael is a Catholic parish church under the authority of the Roman Catholic Diocese of Brooklyn, located at 352 42nd Street at Fourth Avenue in the Sunset Park neighborhood of Brooklyn, New York City. Before the founding of St. Michaels's parish in 1870, Catholics in the area had to travel to mass at either St. John the Evangelist at 21st St. or St. Patrick's in Fort Hamilton. The first pastor was Rev. Michael J. Hickey.

The current church was built 1905, and was designed by noted church architect Raymond F. Almirall. The exterior is in early Romanesque. Often referred to as Brooklyn's own "Sacré-Cœur", the domed tower once was the second tallest building in Brooklyn after the Williamsburg Savings Bank Tower, until a late 2000s high rise development claimed that title.

St. Michael's parochial school opened in 1886; it closed in 2005.

In popular culture
The comedy film Heaven Help Us (1985) was filmed in the neighborhood, using external and internal shots of the church and the now closed St. Michael's Parish School as the fictional St. Basil's Church and St. Basil's School, run by the factual Order of St. Basil.

References

External links

Roman Catholic churches in Brooklyn
Roman Catholic churches completed in 1905
Roman Catholic churches completed in 1921
Religious organizations established in 1870

Romanesque Revival church buildings in New York City
Byzantine Revival architecture in New York City
1870 establishments in New York (state)
Sunset Park, Brooklyn
20th-century Roman Catholic church buildings in the United States